The 2001–02 NBA season was the 34th season for the Phoenix Suns in the National Basketball Association. During the off-season, the Suns acquired All-Star point guard Stephon Marbury from the New Jersey Nets, and re-signed former All-Star Suns guard and three-point specialist Dan Majerle, who was a member of the team when they appeared in the 1993 NBA Finals. Early into the season, the team acquired Bo Outlaw from the Orlando Magic. The Suns got off to a 18–13 start, but soon began to slip under .500 as the season progressed as head coach Scott Skiles struggled to a 25–26 record, and was replaced by former Suns guard Frank Johnson. The Suns posted a six-game losing streak in March and lost eight of their final eleven games, finishing the regular season at 36–46, and missing the playoffs for the first time since 1988. All home games were played at America West Arena.

Marbury would lead the team in scoring and assists, averaging 20.4 points and 8.1 assists per game, becoming the first Suns player to average 20 or more points per game since Kevin Johnson during the 1996–97 season. Shawn Marion increased his scoring as well, averaging 19.1 points per game along with 9.9 rebounds per game. Rodney Rogers and Tony Delk both continued to provide the team with scoring off the bench, before both being traded to the Boston Celtics in exchange for top draft pick Joe Johnson midway through the season. Penny Hardaway returned to appear in 80 games, after being sidelined all but four games the season before, and averaged 12.0 points and 4.1 assists per game. Johnson, who earned NBA All-Rookie Second Team honors, rounded out a team rich in talent at the guard position. Tom Gugliotta was again plagued by knee injury, only playing just 44 games due to left quadriceps tendonitis.

The season was a disappointment for an organization looking to build a new core of talent. For the first time since the 1996–97 season, the All-Star Game did not feature a Suns player. To complete the season on a low note, a franchise-record of 13 straight playoff appearances was snapped when the Suns failed to qualify for postseason play. Following the season, Majerle retired after playing in his second stint with the Suns.

Offseason

NBA draft

Roster

Roster Notes
 Point guard Randy Brown was acquired from the Boston Celtics at midseason, but did not play for the Suns this season due to a right adductor strain.

Regular season

Standings

Record vs. opponents

Awards and honors

Week/Month
 Shawn Marion was named Western Conference Player of the Month for March.
 Stephon Marbury was named Western Conference Player of the Week for games played November 26 through December 2.
 Shawn Marion was named Western Conference Player of the Week for games played March 25 through March 31.

Season
 Joe Johnson was named to the NBA All-Rookie Second Team.

Player statistics

Season

* – Stats with the Suns.
† – Minimum 300 field goals made.
^ – Minimum 55 three-pointers made.
# – Minimum 125 free throws made.

Transactions

Trades

Free agents

Additions

Subtractions

Player Transactions Citation:

References

External links
 Standings on Basketball Reference

See also
 2001–02 NBA season

Phoenix Suns seasons